Mendiburu is a Basque surname. Notable people with this surname include:
 Javier Mendiburu (born 1980), Spanish basketball player
 Luis Ángel Mendiburu, Triple A murder victim
 Manuel de Mendiburu (1805–1885), Peruvian statesman
 Sandrine Mendiburu (born 1972), French golfer
 Michael MendiburuCuyama Basque Handball Player (born 1996)